Emma Freedman is an Australian television and radio presenter who grew up on the Mornington Peninsula.  Freedman formerly co-hosted The Grill Team on  Triple M Sydney. Prior to this, she was a weather presenter on Weekend Today and host of Sports Sunday on the Nine Network.

Career

Radio and television
In 2010, Freedman joined Weekend Today as a weather presenter, replacing Felicity Whelan, after which she shared hosting duties with Steven Jacobs as a weather presenter for Today.  She was a regular contributor to the Nine Network's coverage of the Melbourne Spring Racing Carnival for many years.  Freedman was also a regular sports presenter on the Nine Network's Wide World of Sports and Weekend Today. In December 2014, Freedman was made redundant from the Nine Network due to cost-cutting measures.

In 2015, Freedman competed in and won the fifteenth season of Dancing with the Stars partnered with Aric Yegudkin.

In January 2015, Jules Lund and Freedman were announced as hosts of The Scoopla Show which aired on the Hit Network. She was appointed national drive news presenter on Hit Network in September 2015.  In February 2016, she re-signed with  Southern Cross Austereo to host the Hit 30 and Take 40 Australia across the Hit Network. In October 2016, she moved from the Hit Network to Triple M Sydney to co-host The Grill Team.

In March 2016, Freedman rejoined Nine Network to host the Wide World of Sports. She was appointed host of Sports Sunday in March 2017.

In March 2018, Freedman joined the team of presenters on Foxtel's Fox League channel.

In 2021, she hosted 7mate's morning coverage of the 2020 Tokyo Olympics. In October 2021, she joined Seven's horse racing coverage hosting Sydney racing.

Writing
Freedman's ballet-themed coming of age novel, Turning Pointes, was published by HarperCollins in 2016.

Personal life
Freedman is the daughter of five-time Melbourne Cup winning thoroughbred horse trainer Lee Freedman.

References

External links

Australian television presenters
Australian women television presenters
Living people
Dancing with the Stars (Australian TV series) winners
Year of birth missing (living people)
Fox Sports (Australian TV network) people